Erdi is a Turkish name. Notable people with the name include:

 Erdi Öner (born 1986), Turkish footballer
 Erdi Bakırcı (born 1989), Turkish footballer
 Mária Érdi (born 1998), Hungarian competitive sailor
 Péter Érdi (born 1946), Hungarian–American computational neuroscientist

See also 
 Erdi Musa, a village in the Sabalan District of Sareyn County, Ardabil Province, Iran
 Érdi VSE, a Hungarian football club